José Cevallos may refer to:

 José Cevallos Cepeda (1831–1893), Mexican politician
 José Cevallos (footballer, born 1971), Ecuadorian football goalkeeper
 José Cevallos (footballer, born 1995), Ecuadorian football attacking midfielder for Emelec, and son of footballer born 1971